Pending may refer to:
Pending
Pending (state constituency), represented in the Sarawak State Legislative Assembly
Pending LRT station, a light rail station in Bukit Panjang, Singapore
Wikipedia:PENDING